The Battle of Neuve Chapelle (10–13 March 1915) took place in the First World War in the Artois region of France. The attack was intended to cause a rupture in the German lines, which would then be exploited with a rush to the Aubers Ridge and possibly Lille. A French assault at Vimy Ridge on the Artois plateau was also planned to threaten the road, rail and canal junctions at La Bassée from the south as the British attacked from the north. The British attackers broke through German defences in a salient at the village of Neuve-Chapelle but the success could not be exploited.

If the French Tenth Army captured Vimy Ridge and the north end of the Artois plateau, from Lens to La Bassée, as the First Army took Aubers Ridge from La Bassée to Lille, a further advance of  would cut the roads and railways used by the Germans, to supply the troops in the Noyon Salient from Arras south to Rheims. The French part of the offensive was cancelled when the British were unable to relieve the French IX Corps north of Ypres, which had been intended to move south for the attack and the Tenth Army contribution was reduced to support from its heavy artillery.

The battle was the first deliberately planned British offensive and showed the form which position warfare took for the rest of the war on the Western Front. Tactical surprise and a break-in were achieved, after the First Army prepared the attack with great attention to detail. After the first set-piece attack, unexpected delays slowed the tempo of operations and command was undermined by communication failures. Infantry-artillery co-operation broke down when the telephone system ceased to work and the Germans had time to send in reinforcements and dig a new line.

The British attempted to renew the advance, by attacking where the original assault had failed, instead of reinforcing success, and a fresh attack with the same detailed preparation as that on the first day became necessary. A big German counter-attack by twenty infantry battalions early on 12 March was a costly failure. Sir Douglas Haig, the First Army commander, cancelled further attacks and ordered the captured ground to be consolidated, preparatory to a new attack further north. An acute shortage of artillery ammunition made another attack impossible, apart from a local effort by the 7th Division, which was another costly failure. The Germans strengthened the defences opposite the British and increased the number of troops in the area. One consequence of the battle was that the French became cautiously optimistic that British forces could be reliable in offensive operations.

Battle
Despite poor weather, the early stages of the battle went extremely well for the British. The RFC quickly secured aerial dominance and set about bombarding railways and German reserves en route. At  on 10 March, the British began a thirty-five-minute artillery bombardment by ninety 18-pounder field guns of the Indian Corps and IV Corps, on the German wire which was destroyed within ten minutes. The remaining fifteen 18-pounder field gun batteries, six 6-inch howitzer siege batteries and six QF 4.5-inch howitzer batteries, with sixty howitzers, fired on the German front-line trenches. The 1st Canadian Division at Fleurbaix, several kilometres north-east of Neuve Chapelle, provided artillery support and machine-gun fire as a diversion to prevent the Germans from reinforcing the sector. The artillery bombardment was followed by an infantry assault at 

The Garhwal Brigade of the Meerut Division, Indian Corps attacked with all four battalions on a  front, from Port Arthur to Pont Logy. On the right the attack quickly collapsed, both companies losing direction and veering to the right. The attack confronted a part of the German defences that had not been bombarded by the artillery and before the mistake was realised the two support companies followed suit. The Indian troops forced their way through the German wire and took  of the German front trench, despite many casualties.

A gap of  had been created by the loss of direction on the right, where the German garrison had been severely bombarded but the survivors, about two platoons of the 10th Company, Infantry Regiment 16, fought on. A fresh British attack was arranged from the north, in which the Garhwal Brigade were to join in with a frontal assault. Haig ordered more attacks that day, with similarly disappointing results.

The German defences in the centre were quickly overrun on a  front and Neuve Chapelle was captured by  At Haig's request, the British Commander-in-Chief, Field Marshal Sir John French, released the 5th Cavalry Brigade to exploit the expected breakthrough. Although aerial photography had been useful, it was not sufficient to identify efficiently German strong points. Primitive communications also meant that the British commanders had been unable to keep in touch with each other, the battle became uncoordinated and this disrupted the delivery of supplies. On 12 March, the 6th Army (Crown Prince Rupprecht) counter-attacked; the attempt failed but forced the British to use most of their artillery ammunition; the British offensive was postponed on 13 March and abandoned two days later.

Aftermath

Analysis 

The battle at Neuve Chapelle showed that trench defences could be breached if the attack was carefully prepared and disguised to achieve at least local surprise. After the initial shock, the German defenders recovered, just as the attackers were beset by delays, loss of communication and disorganisation. In his report at the end of March, Major-General John Du Cane wrote that the First Army command system disintegrated after the capture of Neuve Chapelle. Although Haig claimed he had made his intent plain to his subordinates, he felt they had not grasped the "spirit" of the plan and had failed to press on when initial objectives had been captured. One of the subordinates later claimed that pressing on was pointless, due to the lack of ammunition.

The British telephone system proved vulnerable to German artillery-fire and the movement of troops along communication trenches was delayed by far more than the most pessimistic expectations. Equilibrium between attack and defence quickly resumed, which could only be upset by another set-piece attack, after a delay for preparation which gave the defenders just as much time to reorganise. The attack front was found to have been wide enough to overcome the small number of German reserves but the attackers had not been ordered to assist units which had been held up. British reinforcements were sent to renew failed attacks rather than reinforce success. Small numbers of German troops in strong-points and isolated trenches, had been able to maintain a volume of small-arms fire sufficient to stop the advance of far greater numbers of attackers.

The battle had no strategic effect but showed that the British were capable of mounting an organised attack, after several winter months of static warfare. In 1961 Alan Clark wrote that relations with the French improved, because British commanders had shown themselves willing to order attacks regardless of loss and quoted Brigadier-General John Charteris that

In 2004, George Cassar called the battle a British tactical success but that the strategic intentions had not been met. Jack Sheldon was less complimentary and wrote that although the attack had shocked the 6th Army, it quickly amended its defensive tactics and that the British had also been shocked that such a carefully planned attack had collapsed after the first day. Sheldon called the British analysis of the battle "bluster" and wrote that Joseph Joffre, the French commander, praised the results of the first day, then dismissed the significance of the attack "" (But it was a success which led to nothing.). The German and French armies began to revise their low opinion of the BEF, the Germans having assumed that the British would remain on the defensive to release French troops and had risked keeping as few troops as possible opposite the British. The German defences were hurriedly strengthened and more troops brought in to garrison them. The French had also expected that the British troops would only release French soldiers from quiet areas and that British participation in French attacks would be a secondary activity. After the battle French commanders made more effort to co-operate with the BEF and plan a combined attack from Arras to Armentières.

The expenditure of artillery ammunition on the first day had consumed about 30 per cent of the field-gun ammunition in the First Army, which was equivalent to 17 days' shell production per gun. After the battle, French reported to Field Marshal Lord Kitchener, the British Secretary of State for War, that fatigue and the shortage of ammunition had forced a suspension of the offensive. On 15 March French abandoned the offensive as the supply of field-gun ammunition was inadequate. News of the ammunition shortage led to the Shell Crisis of 1915 which, along with the resignation of Admiral Fisher over the naval attack on the Dardanelles, brought down the Liberal government. The Prime Minister H. H. Asquith formed a new coalition government and appointed David Lloyd George as Minister of Munitions. It was a recognition that the whole economy would have to be adapted for war, if the Allies were to prevail on the Western Front. The battle also affected British tactical thinking with the idea that infantry offensives accompanied by artillery barrages could break the trench warfare stalemate.

Casualties

The British suffered  and the Indian Corps  the 40,000 troops in the offensive. The 6th Bavarian Reserve Division suffered  from 11 to 13 March, Bavarian Reserve Infantry Regiment 21  Infantry Regiment 14 of VII Corps suffered  from 7 to 12 March and Infantry Regiment 13  from 6 to 27 March. During its diversionary assault in support of the main offensive, the 1st Canadian Division suffered  nearly

Commemoration and legacy
The Neuve-Chapelle Indian Memorial commemorates 4,700 Indian soldiers and labourers who died on the Western Front during the First World War and have no known graves; the location was chosen because it was at the Battle of Neuve Chapelle that the Indian Corps fought its first big offensive action. War graves of the Indian Corps and the Indian Labour Corps are found at Ayette, Souchez and Neuve-Chapelle. Along with the Indian Corps, the battle was the first big battle of the Canadian Expeditionary Force.

Victoria Cross
 Corporal William Anderson, 2nd Battalion, The Green Howards.
 Private Edward Barber, 1st Battalion, The Grenadier Guards.
 Private William Buckingham, 2nd Battalion, Leicestershire Regiment.
 Company Sergeant-Major Harry Daniels, 2nd Battalion, The Rifle Brigade.
 Captain Charles Calveley Foss, 2nd Battalion, Bedfordshire Regiment.
 Lance Corporal Wilfred Dolby Fuller, 1st Battalion, The Grenadier Guards.
 Lieutenant Cyril Gordon Martin, 56th Field Company R. E. (3rd Division).
 Rifleman Gabbar Singh Negi, 2nd Battalion, 39th Garhwal Rifles.
 Corporal Cecil Noble, 2nd Battalion, The Rifle Brigade.
 Private Jacob Rivers, 1st Battalion, Sherwood Foresters.

See also

 Indian Army during World War I
 Battle of Hill 60 (Western Front)

Notes

References

References

Books

Websites

Further reading

External links

 German Official History situation map, 10 March 1915 OÖLB
 Indian and Chinese cemetery, Ayette
 Indian Corps at the Battle of Neuve Chapelle
 The Indian Memorial at Neuve Chapelle
 World War I Document Archive – The Battle of Neuve Chapelle by Count Charles de Souza
 World War One Battlefields: Neuve Chapelle

Conflicts in 1915
1915 in France
Neuve Chapelle
Neuve Chapelle
Neuve Chapelle
Neuve Chapelle
Aerial operations and battles of World War I
Battle honours of the Rifle Brigade
March 1915 events